Washington Township is a township in Gloucester County, in the U.S. state of New Jersey. As of the 2020 United States census, the township's population was 48,677, an increase of 118 (+.2%) from the 2010 census count of 48,559, which in turn reflected an increase of 1,445 (3.1%) from the 47,114 counted in the 2000 census. For 2021, the Census Bureau's Population Estimates Program calculated a population of 49,391.

Washington Township was incorporated by an act of the New Jersey Legislature on February 17, 1836, from portions of Deptford Township. The township officially moved to the newly created Camden County on March 13, 1844. Monroe Township was created on March 3, 1859, from part of the township. Most of Washington Township, along with all of Monroe Township, was moved back into Gloucester County on February 28, 1871, with the remaining portions of Washington Township that were still in Camden County being transferred to Gloucester Township. Additional transfers to Gloucester Township were made in 1926 and 1931. The township was named for George Washington, one of more than ten communities statewide named for the first president. It is one of five municipalities in the state of New Jersey with the name Washington Township. Washington, New Jersey, another borough, is surrounded by Washington Township in Warren County.

The township is part of the Delaware Valley (i.e. the Philadelphia metropolitan area) and the South Jersey region. In 2008, CNN and Money Magazine ranked Washington Township 58th on its list of the "100 Best Cities to Live in the United States".

History
The oldest community in Washington Township, Grenloch Terrace, was a thriving Lenape Native American settlement called Tetamekon. Some of the early settlers to the area were the Collins family of Chestnut Ridge Farm, for whom Chestnut Ridge Middle School is named; the Turner family, for whom Turnersville was named; the Hurff family, for whom Hurffville and Hurffville Elementary School are named; the Heritage family, whose family began the Heritage's Dairy Farm Stores, and for whom the community Heritage Valley is named; the Morgan family, who were the first residents of the Olde Stone House, a landmark for residents of the township; and the Bell Family, who arrived in 1899 and for whom Bells Lake Park and Bells Elementary School are named. Sewell is named after General William Joyce Sewell, who was elected to the United States Senate in 1881 and 1895, and served as president of the New Jersey Senate in 1876, 1879 and 1880.

Geography
According to the U.S. Census Bureau, the township had a total area of 21.55 square miles (55.81 km2), including 21.35 square miles (55.28 km2) of land and 0.20 square miles (0.53 km2) of water (0.95%).

Turnersville, with a 2010 census population of 3,742,) is an unincorporated community and census-designated place (CDP) located within Washington Township.

Other unincorporated communities, localities, and places located partially or completely in the township include Bells Lake, Cressville, Dilkesboro, Fairview, Green Tree, Grenloch Terrace, Hurffville, Mount Pleasant, and Prossers Mill.

The township borders the municipalities of Deptford Township, Glassboro, Mantua Township, Monroe Township, Pitman in Gloucester County; and Gloucester Township in Camden County.

Demographics

2010 census

The Census Bureau's 2006–2010 American Community Survey showed that (in 2010 inflation-adjusted dollars) median household income was $79,017 (with a margin of error of +/− $3,281) and the median family income was $94,585 (+/− $3,639). Males had a median income of $62,702 (+/− $2,103) versus $46,628 (+/− $2,959) for females. The per capita income for the borough was $33,038 (+/− $1,285). About 2.6% of families and 3.9% of the population were below the poverty line, including 5.3% of those under age 18 and 5.4% of those age 65 or over.

2000 census
As of the 2000 census, there were 47,114 people, 15,609 households, and 12,658 families residing in the township. The racial makeup of the township was 90.20% White, 4.85% African American, 0.08% Native American, 3.31% Asian, 0.01% Pacific Islander, 0.53% from other races, and 1.01% from two or more races. Hispanic or Latino of any race were 2.03% of the population.

There were 15,609 households, out of which 43.8% had children under the age of 18 living with them, 68.3% were married couples living together, 9.8% had a female householder with no husband present, and 18.9% were non-families. 15.4% of all households were made up of individuals, and 5.8% had someone living alone who was 65 years of age or older.  The average household size was 3.00 and the average family size was 3.38.

In the township, the population was spread out, with 28.7% under the age of 18, 8.0% from 18 to 24, 29.6% from 25 to 44, 24.7% from 45 to 64, and 9.0% who were 65 years of age or older.  The median age was 36 years. For every 100 females, there were 94.0 males.  For every 100 females age 18 and over, there were 89.8 males.

The median income for a household in the township was $66,546, and the median income for a family was $74,661. Males had a median income of $51,319 versus $35,018 for females. The per capita income for the township was $25,705.  About 2.5% of families and 3.2% of the population were below the poverty line, including 3.2% of those under age 18 and 4.5% of those age 65 or over.

Government

Local government 
Washington Township is governed under the Faulkner Act, formally known as the Optional Municipal Charter Law. by the Mayor-Council system of New Jersey municipal government (Plan 2), implemented based on direct petition as of January 1, 1985. The township is one of 71 municipalities (of the 564) statewide that use this form of government. The township's governing body is comprised of the Mayor and the five-member Township Council. The mayor is directly elected by township voters and is the chief executive in charge of the administrative functions of the town. Members of the township council are elected on an at-large basis in partisan elections held as part of the November general election. All elected officials serve four-year terms of office on a staggered basis, with the mayor and two council seats up for election in even-numbered years and the other three council seats up for vote two years later.

, the mayor of Washington Township is Democrat Joann Gattinelli, whose term of office ends December 31, 2024. Members of the township council are Council President Sean Longfellow (D, 2022), Council Vice-President Andrea Dougherty (D, 2022), Richard Bennett (R, 2024), Anthony DellaPia (R, 2024) and Andra Williams (D, 2022).

Federal, state and county representation 
Washington Township is located in the 1st Congressional District and is part of New Jersey's 4th state legislative district.

Politics
As of March 2011, there were a total of 33,934 registered voters in Washington, of which 11,872 (35.0%) were registered as Democrats, 7,763 (22.9%) were registered as Republicans and 14,279 (42.1%) were registered as Unaffiliated. There were 20 voters registered to other parties.

In the 2012 presidential election, Republican Mitt Romney received 49.7% of the vote (12,169 cast), ahead of Democrat Barack Obama with 49.2% (12,050 votes), and other candidates with 1.1% (273 votes), among the 24,648 ballots cast by the township's 35,305 registered voters (156 ballots were spoiled), for a turnout of 69.8%. In the 2008 presidential election, Democrat Barack Obama received 49.6% of the vote (12,815 cast), ahead of Republican John McCain with 48.6% (12,570 votes) and other candidates with 1.0% (268 votes), among the 25,859 ballots cast by the township's 35,224 registered voters, for a turnout of 73.4%. In the 2004 presidential election, Republican George W. Bush received 50.9% of the vote (12,805 ballots cast), outpolling Democrat John Kerry with 48.0% (12,082 votes) and other candidates with 0.5% (163 votes), among the 25,149 ballots cast by the township's 33,043 registered voters, for a turnout percentage of 76.1.

In the 2013 gubernatorial election, Republican Chris Christie received 67.1% of the vote (9,129 cast), ahead of Democrat Barbara Buono with 31.6% (4,294 votes), and other candidates with 1.3% (172 votes), among the 13,803 ballots cast by the township's 34,580 registered voters (208 ballots were spoiled), for a turnout of 39.9%. In the 2009 gubernatorial election, Republican Chris Christie received 52.6% of the vote (7,789 ballots cast), ahead of  Democrat Jon Corzine with 38.8% (5,757 votes), Independent Chris Daggett with 7.0% (1,043 votes) and other candidates with 0.5% (79 votes), among the 14,820 ballots cast by the township's 34,338 registered voters, yielding a 43.2% turnout.

Education 
Washington Township Public School District serves students in kindergarten through twelfth grade. As of the 2018–19 school year, the district, comprised of 11 schools, had an enrollment of 7,202 students and 651.3 classroom teachers (on an FTE basis), for a student–teacher ratio of 11.1:1. Schools in the district (with 2018–19 enrollment data from the National Center for Education Statistics) are 
Grenloch Terrace Early Childhood Center (with 339 students; in kindergarten), 
Bells Elementary School (429; 1–5), 
Birches Elementary School (443; 1–5), 
Hurffville Elementary School (492; 1–5), 
Thomas Jefferson Elementary School (527; 1–5), 
Wedgewood Elementary School (460; 1–5), 
Whitman Elementary School (494; 1–5), 
Bunker Hill Middle School (586; 6–8), 
Chestnut Ridge Middle School (696; 6–8), 
Orchard Valley Middle School (544; 6–8), and 
Washington Township High School with 2,237 students in grades 9–12.

Students from across the county are eligible to apply to attend Gloucester County Institute of Technology, a four-year high school in Deptford Township that provides technical and vocational education. As a public school, students do not pay tuition to attend the school.

Economy
Washington Township has two major economic centers. The town center is focused around the square formed by Greentree Road, Egg Harbor Road, Ganttown Road, and Hurffville-Crosskeys Road. Washington Township High School, the TD Bank Arts Centre, Washington Lake Park, and the township municipal building are located around this general vicinity. The other major center is located around Route 42, which connects Philadelphia to the Jersey Shore.

Washington Township is sometimes referred to as "South Jersey's Premier Community", "South Philly South", or "Little South Philly" since a large percentage of its citizens moved to the town from the largely Italian South Philadelphia region over the past several decades. It is also known simply as "Township".

Recent expansion
Washington Township is largely the frontline between open space and home developers. A township that in the 1960s was composed of several isolated housing areas gravitating around the Wedgwood, Whitman Square, Birches, Birches West, and Hurffville neighborhoods has expanded outwards.

Transportation

Roads and highways

There are several major roadways that pass through Washington Township. Route 42 (Black Horse Pike) heads along the east side of the township, entering in the south from Monroe Township and continuing north for  towards Gloucester Township in Camden County, where the road is known as the North-South Freeway. Route 168 (also known as Black Horse Pike) has its southern terminus at Route 42 in Washington Township and heads north along the township border towards Gloucester Township. Route 47 (Delsea Drive) runs along the western quarter of the township, entering in the south from Glassboro and proceeding north for  towards Deptford Township. The Atlantic City Expressway enters from Gloucester Township, and zig-zags through both until its western terminus in Washington Township at Route 42.

County Route 534 (Good Intent Road) enters from Deptford Township on the east and heads into Gloucester Township.

Public transportation

NJ Transit bus service is available to Philadelphia on the 315, 400, 403, 408 and 412 routes, with local service on the 463 route.

In popular culture
Musical groups from Washington Township include pop punk band I Call Fives and pop/hip hop group Kicking Sunrise.

Notable people

People who were born in, residents of, or otherwise closely associated with Washington Township include:

 George Breen (born 1935), former competition swimmer, four-time Olympic medalist and former world record-holder in three events
 King Kong Bundy (born 1957), former WWF professional wrestler, stand-up comedian and actor
 Ryan D'Imperio (born 1987), fullback drafted by the Minnesota Vikings
 Anthony DeAngelo (born 1995), professional ice hockey defenseman for the New York Rangers
 Sam Esmail (born 1977), producer, director, and screenwriter and creator of the television series Mr. Robot
 Linda Fiorentino (born 1958), actress
 Chris Gheysens (born ), president and chief executive officer of Wawa Inc.
 Emily Gray (born 2000), soccer player who plays as a midfielder for North Carolina Courage of the National Women's Soccer League
 Tara Lipinski (born 1982), 1998 Olympic Gold Medalist figure skater
 Gerald Luongo (born 1938), former mayor and one-term member of the New Jersey General Assembly
 Fred H. Madden (born 1954), serves in the New Jersey Senate, representing the 4th Legislative District
 Paul D. Moriarty (born 1956), former mayor of Washington Township who has served in the New Jersey General Assembly since 2006
 Justin Mortelliti (born 1980), actor, singer/songwriter and recording artist
 Cheryl Reeve (born 1966), head coach of Minnesota Lynx who is a two-time WNBA Coach of the Year
 Mike Rossman (born 1955), boxer, WBA light-heavyweight champion
 John Stevens (born 1966), former defenseman who has coached in the NHL at various levels
 Mark Tatulli (born 1963), syndicated comic strip cartoonist and children's book author
 Milt Thompson (born 1959), former MLB outfielder who played for the Philadelphia Phillies
 John E. Wallace Jr. (born 1942), former Associate Justice of the New Jersey Supreme Court who is husband of mayor Barbara Wallace
 John Yurkow, head coach of the Penn Quakers baseball team

References

External links

Washington Township website
Washington Township Public Schools

School Data for the Washington Township Public Schools, National Center for Education Statistics

 
1836 establishments in New Jersey
Faulkner Act (mayor–council)
Populated places established in 1836
Townships in Gloucester County, New Jersey